is a Japanese racing cyclist, who last rode for Japanese amateur team Abenova. He turned professional with Shimano Racing, the team operated by Shimano, after graduating from Osaka Institute of Technology, but soon transferred to Italian teams. He won the Japan Cup in 1997 and is still the only Japanese to win that important race. He became Japanese national champion in the road race in 1997 and 2000, and in the individual time trial in 1999 and 2000. Abe represented Japan in the 2000 Summer Olympics and won a bronze medal in the 2006 Asian Games in the team time trial.

Major results

1996
 1st Stage 6 Tour de Pologne
1997
 1st  Road race, National Road Championships
 1st Japan Cup
1998
 7th Time trial, Asian Games
1999
 1st  Time trial, National Road Championships
2000
 National Road Championships
1st  Road race
1st  Time trial
2001
 2nd Time trial, National Road Championships
2002
 4th Overall Tour of China
2003
 1st Overall Tour of China
2004
 2nd Time trial, National Road Championships
2006
 3rd Team time trial, Asian Games
 3rd Overall Tour of Hainan
 5th Overall Tour de Korea
2007
 9th Overall Jelajah Malaysia
2008
 10th Overall Tour de Taiwan
2009
 10th Time trial, National Road Championships

References

External links

Team Matrix Powertag official site (Japanese)

1969 births
Living people
Japanese male cyclists
Sportspeople from Osaka Prefecture
Cyclists at the 2000 Summer Olympics
Olympic cyclists of Japan
Asian Games medalists in cycling
Cyclists at the 1994 Asian Games
Cyclists at the 1998 Asian Games
Cyclists at the 2006 Asian Games
Medalists at the 2006 Asian Games
Asian Games bronze medalists for Japan